The 3rd constituency of Heves County is one of the single member constituencies of the National Assembly, the national legislature of Hungary. The constituency standard abbreviation: Heves 03. OEVK.

Since 2014, it has been represented by Zsolt Szabó of the Fidesz–KDNP party alliance.

Geography
The 3rd constituency is located in southern part of Heves County.

The constituency borders with 2nd constituency to the north, 1st constituency to the east, 3rd constituency of Jász-Nagykun-Szolnok to the southeast, 2nd constituency of Jász-Nagykun-Szolnok to the south, 9th-, 6th constituency of Pest County and 2nd constituency of Nógrád County to the west and 1st constituency of Nógrád County to the northwest.

List of municipalities
The constituency includes the following municipalities:

History
The 3rd constituency of Heves County was created in 2011 and consisted of the pre-2011 abolished constituencies of 4th and 5th and part of 3rd constituency of this County. Its borders have not changed since its creation.

Members
The constituency was first represented by Zsolt Szabó of the Fidesz from 2014, and he was re-elected in 2018 and 2022.

Election result

2022 election

2018 election

2014 election

References

Heves 3rd